Worcester Polytechnic Institute (WPI) is a private research university in Worcester, Massachusetts. Founded in 1865 in Worcester, WPI was one of the United States' first engineering and technology universities and now has 14 academic departments with over 50 undergraduate and graduate degree programs in science, engineering, technology, management, the social sciences, and the humanities and arts, leading to bachelor's, master's and PhD degrees. WPI's faculty works with students in a number of research areas, including biotechnology, fuel cells, information security, surface metrology, materials processing, and nanotechnology. It is classified among "R2: Doctoral Universities – High research activity".

History 

Worcester Polytechnic Institute was founded by self-made tinware manufacturer, John Boynton, and Ichabod Washburn, owner of the world's largest wire mill. Boynton envisioned science schooling that would elevate the social position of the mechanic and manufacturer, but not necessarily teach the skills needed to become either. Washburn, on the other hand, wanted to teach technical skills through a sophisticated apprenticeship approach. Boynton consulted Seth Sweetser, a pastor, for ways to realize his vision. By chance it happened that Ichabod Washburn had previously consulted Sweetser about the proper way to actualize his own vision.

Washburn was disappointed to learn of Boynton's offer to create a college, although Washburn claimed, "I prefer to be imposed upon by others rather than by myself in withholding where I ought to give," with the help of Sweetser's diplomacy and wisdom, he agreed to build, furnish, and endow a "Department of Practical Mechanics" at Boynton's school. He specified, however, that every student should blend theory learned in the classroom with practice in the shops.

Sweetser drafted a letter expressing Boynton's and Washburn's wish to other significant men within Worcester County. The document was sent to 30 Worcester businessmen. It told of a "liberal proposal to found a Free School for Industrial Science" in Worcester and called for a meeting later in the month. After that meeting the following notice appeared in the Worcester Palladium: "A Gentleman, who for the present withholds his name from the public, offers a fund of $100,000 for the establishment of a scientific school in Worcester, upon the condition that our citizens shall furnish the necessary land and buildings." Further funding and land grants for the university were given by Stephen Salisbury II, who was an influential merchant and later served as the first president of the institute's board of directors.

In response to this anonymous request, more than 225 Worcester citizens and the workers at 20 of the city's factories and machine shops contributed to the construction of the original building. On May 10, 1865, after House and Senate approval, the secretary of the commonwealth recorded the Institute as a legal corporation, and it came into formal existence.

Both Boynton and Washburn died before the opening of the college on November 11, 1868. On that day, Charles O. Thompson, the first president of the Institute stood before WPI's first two buildings named Boynton Hall and Washburn Shops in honor of their respective donors, with their distinctive towers that even then symbolized the institution's two educational objectives of theory and practice, and inaugurated the Worcester County Free Institute of Industrial Science.

WPI was led in its early years by president and professor of chemistry Charles O. Thompson. Early graduates of WPI went on to become mechanical and civil engineers, as well as artisans, bankers, and enter other prominent occupations. WPI continuously expanded its campus and programs throughout the early twentieth century, eventually including graduate studies and a program in electrical engineering. During World War II, WPI offered defense engineering courses and was selected as one of the colleges to direct the V-12 Navy College Training Program.

During this time, WPI suffered from the lack of a unified library system, well-maintained buildings, and national recognition. This changed under the leadership of president Harry P. Storke from 1962 to 1969. Building on growth under Arthur Bronwell's presidency, Storke brought significant change to the school in what would be known as the WPI Plan. The Plan called for the creation of three projects and drastically redesigned the curriculum to address how a student learns. The Storke administration also launched a capital campaign that resulted in the creation of the George C. Gordon Library, added residence halls, an auditorium, and a modern chemistry building. Furthermore, women were first allowed to enter WPI in February 1968. The WPI Plan is the guiding principle behind undergraduate education at the Institute today, and is arguably the most notable contribution WPI has made towards science and engineering education. In 2016, the National Academy of Engineering awarded their prestigious Bernard M. Gordon Prize for Innovation in Engineering and Technology Innovation to WPI, recognizing the institute's groundbreaking approach to engineering education.

Today, WPI is primarily an undergraduate-focused institution, though expansion of graduate and research programs is a long-term goal. The WPI Bioengineering Institute is a significant contributor to Worcester's growing biotechnology industry. Significant research in other fields such as robotics, metallurgy, untethered health care, fuel cells, the learning sciences, applied mathematics and fire protection currently help to maintain WPI's position as an important, specialized research university.

Campus

Set in an urban context in New England's second largest city, WPI's main campus is entirely privately owned, ungated, and uninterrupted by public roads. The campus sits on Boynton Hill, apart from the adjacent neighborhood, which includes restaurants and stores on Highland Street.

Once a laboratory for electromagnetic research, the "Skull Tomb" was built entirely without ferrous metals. Several years after its construction, electrified trolley tracks were built in Worcester which led to the building's disuse. It served for a time as a site for Robert Goddard's rocket fuel research as the building is relatively isolated from other buildings on campus and Dr. Goddard's research had previously led to explosions on campus. Subsequent to the building earning its present nickname, "Skull Tomb", a secret honor society inherited the building. The building was reconditioned in 2004.

The 'Two Towers' shown in old WPI logos show the clock tower of Boynton Hall and the arm and hammer weathervane of the Washburn Shops. The original weathervane was stolen in October 1975 and never recovered. Boynton and Washburn were the university's first buildings, housing the classrooms and laboratories, respectively. The Two Towers symbolize Theory and Practice, which are the foundation of the university and still the approach used today. Boynton was completed in 1868 and Washburn followed shortly after that same year.

WPI's school colors, Crimson and Gray, were inspired by the natural pigmentation of the beech tree next to the bush sitting near the entrance of Boynton Hill. The tree was planted in 1945 and presently stands at over 60 feet tall.

Near the edge of the WPI campus is a large Tudor-style mansion built in 1923 by WPI alumnus Aldus Chapin Higgins and later bequeathed to his alma mater. Named appropriately as the Higgins House, the mansion and the surrounding English garden serves as the backdrop for many alumni events and is the headquarters for the Office of Alumni Relations.

WPI had one of 35 civilian research nuclear reactors licensed to operate in the United States. It was built and used in research during the height of the Cold War but the school's nuclear program ended at the turn of the century. The reactor was decommissioned and filled-in early in 2018 due to heightened security around reactors post-9/11 and lack of need.

A large bronze statue of Gompei the Goat stands at the quad side of the Bartlett Center, WPI's admission building. Gompei was an actual goat given as a gift by the class of 1891 and eventually became the school's official mascot. It was named after the first elected goat keeper, Gompei Kuwada, chosen for his initials (G.K.). The original bronze goat head is located in the Skull Tomb, on a shelf with carved rocks and empty liquor bottles.

The Innovation Studio and Messenger Hall, a $49 million, 78,000-square-foot residential and classroom facility was dedicated in 2018. The Innovation Studio (formerly the Foisie Innovation Studio), designed by Gensler, contains  a robotics lab, a makerspace, various student-used manufacturing technology (3-D printers, etc.), and high-tech classrooms. Messenger Hall is a residence hall with 140 beds and tech suites.
The Innovation Studio was originally named the Foisie Innovation Studio, after Robert Foisie, WPI's biggest donor ever. Controversy emerged surrounding the man's donations, which totaled $63 million across his lifetime, when his wife and children alleged in public and legal filings that he had participated in various criminal practices, most notably stashing money overseas during his divorce and attempting to hire a hitman to kill his son. Following Robert's death in 2018, WPI began in 2021 to erase his name from the Innovation Studio and Business School (formerly the Foisie Business School). This was conducted in accordance with a settlement with Robert's wife, Janet Foisie.

Academics

WPI offers a variety of majors in engineering, science, management, liberal arts, and social science at the undergraduate and graduate level. It is most well known for its engineering disciplines and is one of the top-ranked schools to attend for engineering in North America and the world over. Unlike many peer universities, WPI does not combine related departments into colleges or schools.

WPI's undergrad schedule is also unusual compared to most universities. Instead of a normal semester, WPI has 7-week terms, labeled A through D, with optional E Terms 1 and 2 in the summer. It is normal to take three courses during each term, which allows students to complete a year's worth of Chemistry, Physics, Mathematics, etc. in only one semester. This faster pace allows for students to take more courses to substantiate their diploma. The graduate student calendar follows a mixed schedule of conventional two semester classes and traditional 7-week courses.

WPI's student performance evaluation system uses grades A, B, or C. If a student were to not satisfactorily complete the course or elect to drop the course, they would receive a No Record (NR). The NR designation is used since there is no differentiation between a dropped course or an unsuccessful attempt to complete it.

WPI Corporate and Professional Education (CPE) also offers academic opportunities to individuals and companies. Programs can be offered online, onsite, on campus, or in a blended format. CPE has graduate programs, online degrees and professional development workshops. Among its recent program additions, CPE launched the first online Graduate Certificate in Program Protection Planning, and a new Graduate Certificate focused on Cyber Security for Power Systems.

Project-based learning system

WPI's curriculum is focused on project-based learning, an emphasis established in 1970 as part of what was called the WPI Plan. This allows for a student to learn theory and practices concurrently. This approach includes an Interactive Qualifying Project (IQP) to study the social effects of technology collaboratively with students from other disciplines and a Major Qualifying Project (MQP) that falls within the student's discipline, though they were introduced in the last 40 years. Usually the IQP, and MQP are completed in the junior and senior years, respectively. The MQP is similar to other schools' "senior thesis," while the IQP is a bit more unique.

Global Projects Program

At WPI, the opportunity to complete significant project work off campus is an integral element of an academic program that emphasizes the practical application of knowledge to meaningful technical and societal problems. As of the class of 2022, all first-year students receive a global project scholarship of up to $5,000 for this work. Through the Global Projects Program, over 60% of WPI students complete at least one of their required projects at an off-campus Project Center. Typically, students work under faculty guidance in small teams at Project Centers to address problems posed by external agencies and organizations.

Through the Global Projects Program, WPI sends more engineering students abroad than any US college or university. As of the 2019–2020 academic year, the program included established over 50 Project Centers spanning 6 continents. Between 1974, when the first WPI Project Center was established in Washington, DC, and 2014, over 7,000 students had completed over 2,000 projects in locations around the globe.

The Global Projects Program was cited by the Association of American Colleges and Universities in 2000, when it named WPI one of its 16 Greater Expectations Leadership Institutions to serve as models for the future of undergraduate education in the United States.

Interactive Qualifying Project

The Interactive Qualifying Project (IQP) is described as a "project which relates technology and science to society or human needs." This project is very broad in scope, encompassing a wide variety of topics and actions. Generally, IQPs are designed to solve a societal problem using technology. This can range from improving high school science education to redesigning an irrigation system in Thailand. This project is often done off-campus through WPI's Global Projects Program. From an educational perspective, the IQP serves to emphasize team-based work and introduces a real-world responsibility absent from courses. Many IQPs have made a significant impact on the community in which they are done.

Major Qualifying Project
The Major Qualifying Project (MQP) assesses knowledge in a student's field of study. As mentioned above, this project is similar to a senior thesis, with students doing independent research or design. MQPs are often funded by either WPI or external corporations. Topics of MQPs done in the recent past include the design of the MIR 2 space station life support system module, a study of the effects of stress and nicotine on ADHD, the design of a research rocket, a mathematical viscoelastic cell motility model, experimental research of liquid crystals using atomic force microscopy, and the design of polymers for medicine delivery.

General Requirements

To create a rounded experience, students are also required to fulfill a Humanities and Arts requirement as well as a Social Science & Policy Studies requirement. These are intended to give width, breadth, and context to an engineering degree.

Rankings and reputation

WPI was ranked tied for 66th among national universities in U.S. News & World Reports 2021 review of "Best Colleges" in the U.S. U.S. News & World Report also rated it tied at 42nd for "Most Innovative", 67th for "Best Value", and 265th for "Top Performers on Social Mobility" among national universities.

In 2013, Businessweek ranked Worcester Polytechnic Institute (WPI) No. 1 in the nation for its part-time Master of Business Administration (MBA) program, and No. 1 in the nation for student satisfaction in the program.

In August 2019, Forbes magazine's annual ranking of "America's Top Colleges" placed WPI at No. 93. "Forbes’ college ranking is distinguished by its consumer-centric approach," said Caroline Howard, Director of Editorial Operations, Forbes. "The evaluation of the 650 undergraduate institutions is based exclusively on the quality of the education they provide, the experiences of the students and their post-graduate success and financial well-being."

In 2017, WPI received a gold rating through Sustainability, Tracking, Assessment, and Rating System (also known as STARS) for its sustainability efforts. Worcester Polytechnic Institute is accredited by the New England Commission of Higher Education.

Campus life

Traditions
WPI is host to a number of annual and weekly events. These events usually only attract students, though some events such as Gaming Weekend and Quadfest are large enough to draw in off-campus visitors. Some are listed below in order of occurrence.Homecoming – Sponsored by the Office of Alumni Relations, this fall event brings numerous alumni back to campus to celebrate the past, present, and future of the university.Tuesday Night Trivia – Every week, a student group takes over the Rubin Campus Center stage from 8-10 PM to run a trivia night, including 6 category rounds, 2 picture rounds, and an all-important final question. Prizes are presented for first and second place teams.Saturday Night Gaming – A weekly video game night hosted by the Game Development Club. Games include Rock Band, Super Smash Bros. Brawl, Dance Dance Revolution, and others. Members of the WPI Pokémon Trainers League also meet and play Pokémon games together. Games are located in the Taylor and Chairman's Room on the first floor of the Rubin Campus Center.Weekend Movies – Hosted by SocComm's Films committee. Every Saturday and Sunday, a new film is shown on the WPI campus in Fuller Laboratoires weeks prior to its DVD release. The projection of these movies is handled by Lens and Lights, the student event production club on campus. WPI is one of the few universities capable of showing both 35 mm film and 70 mm film in the same hall.Penny Wars – Created and operated by Alpha Chi Rho, Penny Wars is an annual fund raiser where clubs and Greek organizations on campus compete to raise money for charity. The goal is to collect the most pennies; any money other than pennies counts against your score. Most of the money raised is from competing clubs offsetting the competition with dollars or larger denominations, since it all goes to charity.Choral Alumni Weekend – Hosted by WPI Men's Glee Club (the men's chorus) and Alden Voices (the women's chorus), this weekend is an annual gathering for alumni of these organizations. It begins on Thursday night, when the members and alumni of the chorus gather at O'Connor's restaurant. Friday night, Simple Harmonic Motion (WPI's oldest a cappella group) hosts A Cappella Festival (also known as AC Fest) in Alden Hall, with guest appearances from the other a cappella groups on campus. On Saturday and Sunday, the choruses and their alumni host concerts in Alden Hall, to be performed for WPI students and parents.Costume! Dance! Party! – An annual event held by the Game Development Club. The event falls near Halloween, and includes a costume contest, over 100 pounds of free candy, and many giveaways.Winter Carnival – Another event hosted by WPI's Social Committee  (SocComm), this event is a week long grouping of smaller events, ending in a major event, generally a performance by a major artist (past artists include The Wrecks, Bia, and the All-American Rejects).Quadfest – The largest event held on campus by the WPI Social Committee (SocComm). It takes place during the final week of the WPI school year. Events include musical acts, movies, and special booths created by WPI clubs and organizations. Information about past Quadfest events can be found in the QuadFest Archives.WPI Talent and Fashion Show – Beginning in 2007, the National Society of Black Engineers chapter combined their seventh annual Fashion Show and third annual Talent Show into a single event. The Talent Show part gives every WPI student an opportunity to showcase their talent to each other, and the Fashion show is meant to promote professionalism and how to dress for success, tying into the core purpose of the NSBE.Winter Ball – A ballroom dance social hosted by WPI's Ballroom Dance Team during the winter where couples in evening wear can learn and dance ballroom dances such as Waltz, Foxtrot, ChaCha, and Rumba in Alden Memorial.Comedy Festival – A formerly biennial, now annual, comedy festival hosted by WPI's Student Comedy Productions (SCP) at the end of the academic year, first produced in 2002. A several-day event showcasing the comedic talents of college students both inside and outside WPI, the festival has featured the school's three comedy troupes, KILROY Sketch Comedy, Guerilla Improv, and {Empty Set} as well as collegiate and alumni comedy groups from across New England.New Voices''' – An annual play festival produced by the WPI Masque and the Department of Humanities and Arts in the middle of D-Term.  The festival features original, unproduced works submitted each January and voted on by a collective of dramaturgs.  First run in 1983, New Voices is the longest-running annual collegiate new works festival in the world, and has produced over 400 plays written by over 200 students, alumni, faculty, and members of the WPI community.

More than thirty percent of the undergraduate students participate in Greek Life. There are 13 fraternities and 6 sororities at WPI. There is also one co-ed community service fraternity, Alpha Phi Omega. See the List of WPI fraternities and sororities.

Athletics

WPI supports 20 varsity athletic teams that compete in the New England Women's and Men's Athletic Conference, New England Wrestling Association, and the Eastern College Athletic Conference. WPI athletic teams compete intercollegiately at the NCAA Division III level.

Athletic center

WPI's 145,000-square-foot, LEED-certified building Sports and Recreation Center was dedicated in 2012, and includes racquetball and squash courts, jogging track, and swimming pool.

Mascot

In the spring of 1891, the class of 1893 stole a goat and used it as a mascot. The goat was tended by a student, Gumpei (Gompei) Kuwada, because he was the only one with the initials G.K. in reference to the job of goat keeper. The mascot of WPI is still a goat and in honor of the first goat keeper the mascot's name is Gompei.

Student newspaper
In 2018 Tech News, formerly known as The Towers and Newspeak, was the current name of a student-run newspaper founded in 1909, with an online version and physical copies produced.

 Wireless Association (W1YK) 

 History of the Association 

The WPI Wireless Association is regarded as the first College Amateur Radio Club to be on the air. Founded in 1909, by Oliver B. Jacobs and a group of 40 other men, the club has a historically significant role in the early age of wireless communications both in the United States and the world. The Wireless Association was one of the first 12 stations heard by Paul Godely, an American who went to Scotland to conduct the first Transatlantic Tests, when stations in America and Scotland tried to hear each other across the Atlantic Ocean.

 The Current Association 
The current club has members with licenses ranging from Technician to the highest class, Amateur Extra. The club currently and has operated for decades out of the Radio Shack on the roof of Salisbury Laboratories. The club manages several public repeaters that reach around Worcester such as the Higgins Repeater. W1YK, the official Federal Communications Commission-licensed callsign of the club, and its members participate in the American Radio Relay League Sweepstakes each year, including the November Sweeps. The members of the club participate in marathons, triathlons, and other events that need radio operators.

 Alumni 

Todd Akin (Class of 1970) Former member U.S. House of Representatives representing Missouri's 2nd District. Best known for his claim that victims of what he described as "legitimate rape" very rarely become pregnant.
Paul Allaire (Class of 1960) is a former CEO of Xerox.
Harold Stephen Black (Class of 1921) revolutionized electronics by inventing the negative feedback amplifier in 1927.
Loree Griffin Burns (Class of 1991)
Giovanni Capriglione (Class of c. 1995), degree in physics; Republican member of the Texas House of Representatives from Tarrant County, Texas.
Curtis Carlson (Class of 1967) is a famous imaging systems researcher and current president and CEO of SRI International.
Karen Casella (Class of 1983) is a software engineer and advocate for inclusion in the technology industry.
John W. Geils Jr. (dropped out in 1967) founded The J. Geils Band and played lead guitar. Bandmates Danny Klein and Richard "Magic Dick" Salwitz also left WPI.
David Gewirtz (Class of 1982) is a CNN columnist, cyberterrorism advisor, and leading presidential scholar. He was also a candidate for the 2008 Pulitzer Prize in Letters.
Robert H. Goddard (Class of 1908) is WPI's best-known alumnus, and is widely regarded as the father of modern rocketry.
Eric Hahn (Class of 1980) is the co-founder of Collabra Software (sold to Netscape) and Lookout Software (sold to Microsoft). In 1997 he became the CTO of Netscape.
Elwood Haynes (Class of 1881) was an early alumnus, prominent chemist and inventor and credited for aiding in the development of the automobile and the creation of stainless steel.
William Hobbs (Class of 1883) was a noted 19th-century geologist.
Aldus Chapin Higgins (Class of 1893) was a Worcester, Massachusetts lawyer and businessman who invented a water-cooled electric furnace for the Norton Companies.
John Woodman Higgins (Class of 1896) was the brother of Aldus, and the founder of Worcester Pressed Steel Company and of the Higgins Armory Museum.
Jeremy Hitchcock (Class of 2004) is the co-founder and former CEO of Dyn.
Dan Itse (Class of 1980, 1986) engineer, inventor, member of the New Hampshire House of Representatives.
Lawrence C. Jones (Class of 1915), Vermont Attorney General.
Dean Kamen (dropped out in 1976) invented the first portable insulin pump and started DEKA, the company that invented the Segway Human Transporter.
Atwater Kent (dropped out in 1895 and 1896) went on to found the Atwater Kent Manufacturing Company, which was the world's leading producer of radios in the late 1920s (there is now a building on campus called the Atwater Kent Laboratories).
Everett J. Lake (Class of 1890) was Representative, Connecticut General Assembly, 1903–1905, Senator, Connecticut General Assembly, 1905–1907 Lieutenant Governor, 1907–1909 and Governor, 1921–1923 of Connecticut.
William Stevens Lawton (transferred out in 1918) was a United States Army Lieutenant General, who attended from 1917 to 1918 and then transferred to the United States Military Academy. Lawton served in World War II and the Korean War and was the Army's Comptroller.
Joseph Mancuso (Class of 1963) went on to become WPI's youngest department chairman when he took over the WPI management program after earning an M.B.A. from Harvard. Mancuso went on to become a best-selling author in the business genre, and founded CEO Clubs International, of which he is president and CEO.
Dwight Marcus, Chief technology officer and co-founder.
Yiqi Mei (Class of 1914) was the President of Tsinghua University, and founder of its college of engineering.
Don Peterson (Class of 1971) Former CFO of Lucent Technologies and former founder, CEO, and chairman of Avaya.
Nancy Pimental (Class of 1987) earned a Chemical Engineering degree, is one of the writers of South Park and the movie The Sweetest Thing. She also replaced Jimmy Kimmel as co-host of Win Ben Stein's Money''. She is an alumna of Phi Sigma Sigma.
Daniel Robbins (dropped out) is the founder and former chief architect of the Gentoo Linux project.
Andy Ross (Mass Academy Class of 1997) guitarist, keyboardist and vocalist for the rock band OK Go since 2005 spent a year at WPI as part of the Mass Academy program.
Naveen Selvadurai (Class of 2002) is the co-founder of Foursquare.
Kotaro Shimomura (Class of 1888) was a chemical engineer. After graduating, he became president of Doshisha University and Osaka Gas Co., Ltd in Japan.
James Smith (founder) (Class of 1906) was an American engineer, entrepreneur, educator, and businessman. He was the co-founder and president of the National Radio Institute (NRI) in Washington D.C., which trained 1.5 million students through home study over its 88-year history. Smith's son, James Morrison Smith, was also an alumnus (Class of 1937), as was his grandson, Michael M. Galbraith (Class of 1958). In their lifetimes, they donated, in totality, over one million dollars to WPI and established three four-year full tuition endowed scholarships through the Macamor Foundation, which Smith established in the mid-1950s to continue all of his philanthropic interests after his death.
Chartsiri Sophonpanich (Class of 1980) is the president and director of Bangkok Bank, the largest commercial bank in Thailand.
Robert Stempel (Class of 1955) was the inventor of the catalytic converter and former chairman and CEO of General Motors.
Helen Guillette Vassallo is an American scientific researcher and educator, noted for her contributions to the fields of physiology, pharmacology, and anesthesia.
Gilbert Vernam (Class of 1914) is credited with the inauguration of modern cryptography.
Richard T. Whitcomb (Class of 1943) was aeronautical engineer responsible for the "area rule" of high-speed aircraft design, the supercritical airfoil, and winglets

Faculty 
WPI has employed several professors whose achievements have made them notable across the nation and the world.

In 1995, Biology professor David Adams was the first to create a mouse which suffered from Alzheimers.
Former history of science and technology professor Michael Sokal is currently serving as the president of the History of Science Society.
Kaveh Pahlavan, professor of electrical and computer engineering and director of the Center for Wireless Information Network Studies (CWINS) who, during the 1990s, helped develop the 802.11 wireless protocols.
Richard H. Gallagher, former professor of mechanical engineering and vice president of academic affairs, was one of the originators of the Finite Element Method. 
Umberto Mosco, professor of mathematical sciences and eponym of Mosco convergence.
George Phillies, physics professor and 2008 Libertarian presidential candidate.
Current professor of practice, James Lyneis, serves as the president of the System Dynamics Society. He is the third WPI faculty member to serve in this post, the other two being Michael J. Radzicki (SDS President 2006), and Khalid Saeed (SDS President 1995).
Brian Moriarty, professor of interactive media and game development.
Frederick Bianchi, Director of Music Technology and co-inventor of the Virtual Orchestra.
Joseph Mancuso (class of 1963) went on to become WPI's youngest department chairman when he took over the WPI management program after earning an M.B.A. from Harvard. Mancuso went on to become a best-selling author in the business genre, and founded the CEO Clubs International, of which he is president and CEO.
Albert Sacco Jr. Astronaut, former professor of chemical engineering and department head. Served as payload specialist on the STS-73 mission in 1995.
Mimi Sheller, Dean of the Global School and theorist of mobilities.

See also 
 Association of Independent Technological Universities

References

External links

 

 
Educational institutions established in 1865
Private universities and colleges in Massachusetts
Universities and colleges in Worcester, Massachusetts
Engineering universities and colleges in Massachusetts
Technological universities in the United States
1865 establishments in Massachusetts